Egon Eis, born Egon Eisler (6 October 1910 – 6 September 1994) was an Austrian screenwriter. He wrote for nearly 50 films between 1930 and 1983. Eis was forced into exile during the Nazi era, but returned to work in the German film industry after the Second World War where he worked on the popular series of Edgar Wallace films as well as other projects. He was born in Vienna, Austria and died in Munich, Germany. His brother Otto Eis was also a screenwriter.

Filmography

Screenwriter

 The Tiger Murder Case (dir. Johannes Meyer, 1930)
  (dir. Alfred Zeisler, 1930) — based on a novel by Curt Siodmak
 The Copper (dir. Richard Eichberg, 1930)
 Täter gesucht (dir. Carl Heinz Wolff, 1931) — based on a novel by Frank Arnau
  (dir. Karl Grune, 1931) — based on a play by Josef Matthäus Velter
  (dir. Karl Grune, Robert Péguy, 1931) — based on a play by Josef Matthäus Velter
 Express 13 (dir. Alfred Zeisler, 1931)
 Tropical Nights (dir. Leo Mittler, 1931) — based on Victory by Joseph Conrad
 The Squeaker (dir. Karel Lamač, Martin Frič, 1931) — based on The Squeaker by Edgar Wallace
 Salto Mortale (dir. E. A. Dupont, 1931) — based on a novel by 
 The Paw (dir. Hans Steinhoff, 1931)
 The Man with the Claw (dir. Nunzio Malasomma, 1931)
 A Shot at Dawn (dir. Alfred Zeisler, 1932) — based on a play by Harry Jenkins
  (dir. Serge de Poligny, 1932) — based on a play by Harry Jenkins
 Teilnehmer antwortet nicht (dir. Rudolph Cartier, Marc Sorkin, 1932)
 Embrujo antillano (dir. Juan Orol, 1947)
 Algo flota sobre el agua (dir. Alfredo B. Crevenna, 1948) — based on a novel by Lajos Zilahy
 La casa de la Troya (dir. Carlos Orellana, 1948) — based on a novel by Alejandro Pérez Lugín
 La dama del velo (dir. Alfredo B. Crevenna, 1949)
 El rencor de la tierra (dir. Alfredo B. Crevenna, 1949)
 Otra primavera (dir. Alfredo B. Crevenna, 1950) — based on a play by Rodolfo Usigli
 Huellas del pasado (dir. Alfredo B. Crevenna, 1950)
 Yo quiero ser tonta (dir. , 1950) — based on a play by Carlos Arniches
 Girls in Uniform (dir. Alfredo B. Crevenna, 1951) — remake of Mädchen in Uniform
 Doña Clarines (dir. , 1951) — based on a play by the Quintero brothers
 Woman Without Tears (dir. Alfredo B. Crevenna, 1951)
 Canasta uruguaya (dir. René Cardona, 1951)
 El puerto de los siete vicios (dir. , 1951)
 La mujer que tú quieres (dir. Emilio Gómez Muriel, 1952)
 Prisionera del recuerdo (dir. , 1952)
 Women Who Work (dir. Julio Bracho, 1953)
 Victoria and Her Hussar (dir. Rudolf Schündler, 1954) — based on the operetta Viktoria und ihr Husar
 A House Full of Love (dir. Hans Schweikart, 1954) — based on the play Fräulein Fortuna by Ladislas Fodor
 The Phantom of the Big Tent (dir. Paul May, 1954)
 Der Frosch mit der Maske (dir. Harald Reinl, 1959) — based on The Fellowship of the Frog by Edgar Wallace
 The Crimson Circle (dir. Jürgen Roland, 1960) — based on The Crimson Circle by Edgar Wallace
 The Dead Eyes of London (dir. Alfred Vohrer, 1961) — based on The Dark Eyes of London by Edgar Wallace
 The Devil's Daffodil (dir. Ákos Ráthonyi, 1961) — based on The Daffodil Mystery by Edgar Wallace
 The Puzzle of the Red Orchid (dir. Helmut Ashley, 1962) — based on a novel by Edgar Wallace
 The Inn on the River (dir. Alfred Vohrer, 1962) — based on The India-Rubber Men by Edgar Wallace
 He Can't Stop Doing It (dir. Axel von Ambesser, 1962) — based on Father Brown stories by G. K. Chesterton
 The White Spider (dir. Harald Reinl, 1963) — based on a novel by Louis Weinert-Wilton
  (dir. Rudolf Zehetgruber, 1964) — based on a novel by Victor Gunn
 Im Auftrag der schwarzen Front (dir. , 1969, TV film)
 Die Kugel war Zeuge (dir. Rainer Söhnlein, 1974, TV film)
 Zwei Finger einer Hand (dir. Georg Marischka, 1975, TV film)
 Kennwort Schmetterling (dir. , 1981, TV film)
  (dir. Sándor Simó, 1983)
 Ein Mann namens Parvus (dir. Rudolf Nussgruber, 1984, TV film)
  (dir. , 1986, TV film) — based on a novel by Georges Simenon

Film adaptations
Prison sans barreaux, directed by Léonide Moguy (1938, based on the play Gefängnis ohne Gitter)
Prison Without Bars, directed by Brian Desmond Hurst (1938, based on the play Gefängnis ohne Gitter)
Water for Canitoga, directed by Herbert Selpin (1939, based on the play Wasser für Canitoga)
Prison Without Bars (1939, TV play, based on the play Gefängnis ohne Gitter)
I Was a Prisoner on Devil's Island, directed by Lew Landers (1941, based on the story Southern Cross)
Desires, directed by Rolf Hansen (1952, based on the play Das letzte Rezept)
, directed by Rolf von Sydow (1962, based on the story Der Midas von Mittelstadt)

Plays
Das letzte Rezept
Der lächerliche Sir Anthony
Wasser für Canitoga
Neun Offiziere
Gefängnis ohne Gitter

References

External links
 

1910 births
1994 deaths
Austrian male screenwriters
Austrian Jews
Film people from Vienna
Exiles from Nazi Germany
20th-century Austrian screenwriters
20th-century Austrian male writers